The Westhoughton by election took place for the House of Commons of the United Kingdom in Westhoughton on 24 May 1973.

It was won by Roger Stott who held the seat for Labour after the death on 1 February of the previous MP, Tom Price.

Result

Previous result

References

External links
 British Parliamentary by-elections: Westhoughton

Westhoughton 1973
Westhoughton by-election
Westhoughton by-election
Westhoughton by-election
1970s in Lancashire
Westhoughton 1973
Westhoughton 1973
Westhoughton